Pavel Stanev (born 27 October 1986) is a Bulgarian football goalkeeper who currently plays for Kariana Erden.

Career
Born in Plovdiv Stanev was raised in Botev Plovdiv's youth teams. In June 2004 he signed first professional contract with The Canaries. Stanev made his official debut for Botev in the Bulgarian A PFG in a match against Slavia Sofia on 25 September 2005. He substituted Lilcho Arsov in half time and played for 45 minutes. The result of the match was a 0:0. For three years in Botev the goalkeeper played in only 18 matches and in January 2008 was loaned out for six months to Montana (team from the Bulgarian second division).

For Montana Stanev played very good in 15 matches and in June 2008 returned to Botev. In January 2009 he signed with FC Vihren Sandanski.

References

External links
  footmercato profile

1986 births
Living people
Bulgarian footballers
Bulgarian expatriate footballers
Association football goalkeepers
Botev Plovdiv players
FC Montana players
OFC Vihren Sandanski players
FC Botev Vratsa players
Neftochimic Burgas players
FC Caspiy players
FC Kariana Erden players
First Professional Football League (Bulgaria) players
Expatriate footballers in Kazakhstan
Footballers from Plovdiv